Frederick Fry  (1885-1963) was a rugby league footballer in the New South Wales Rugby League (NSWRL) competition in the foundation year of the sport in Australia.
Fred Fry was a fullback in the Eastern Suburbs club's first ever match, on Easter Monday, 20 April 1908. William Fry's Player Number with the Sydney Roosters (formerly Eastern Suburbs) is 6.

In 1909, Fry joined Easts rivals South Sydney and played 3 seasons with the club including being a part of the premiership winning side in 1909.

He was the brother of former South Sydney Rabbitohs legend Ed Fry.

References

 The Encyclopedia Of Rugby League; Alan Whiticker & Glen Hudson

Sydney Roosters players
South Sydney Rabbitohs players
Rugby league fullbacks
Rugby league centres
Rugby league wingers
1885 births
1963 deaths